The Lao People's Democratic Republic is the modern state derived from the final Kingdom of Laos. The political source of Lao history and cultural identity is the Tai kingdom of Lan Xang, which during its apogee emerged as one of the largest kingdoms in Southeast Asia. Lao history is filled with frequent conflict and warfare, but infrequent scholarly attention. The resulting dates and references are approximate, and rely on source material from court chronicles which survived both war and neglect, or outside sources from competing neighboring kingdoms in what are now China, Vietnam, Burma, Thailand, and Cambodia.

Lao kingship was based upon the mandala system established by the example of King Ashoka.  In theory, Lao kings and their successors were chosen by agreement of the king's Sena (a council which could include senior royal family members, ministers, generals and senior members of the sangha or clergy), through the validity the king's lineage, and by personal Dharma through commitment to propagating Theravada Buddhism (the king was literally a Dharmaraja- as one who led by acts of religious virtue). Kingship was not based exclusively on primogeniture or divine right as was common in other monarchies.

The monarchy traces its lineage to Chao Fa Ngum, who founded the Kingdom of Lan Xang in 1353 and beyond that to the mythical Khun Borom who was held as the mythical father of the Tai peoples and the progenitor of the Lao Loum.

Lan Xang endured as a politically unified entity for three hundred years (1353–1694), which was then split into the kingdoms of Vientiane, Luang Prabang, and Champasak, only to be reconstituted as a unified constitutional monarchy under a French protectorate in 1946. At various times the kingdom Lan Xang fought off invasions from Burma, Siam and the Đại Việt.

The traditional capital of Lan Xang was at Luang Prabang until it was moved in 1560 by King Setthathirath to better administer the growing population and provide security in facing threats from Burma and Siam. Lan Xang entered a Golden Age during the reigns of Visunarat (1501–1520) and Sourigna Vongsa from (1637–94), during these times the cultural and economic power of the kingdom were at their greatest. In 1828 Vientiane was razed by the Siamese, in retaliation for the Chao Anouvong Rebellion, at which point the kingdom of Vientiane ceased to exist. During the French Protectorate, Luang Prabang was reestablished as the cultural and religious capital, while the French rebuilt Vientiane as the country's administrative capital.

Kingdom of Lan Xang (1353–1707)

The following is a list of Lan Xang kings from the founding in 1353 by Fa Ngum, to the succession disputes following the death of Souligna Vongsa, and partition of the Kingdom in 1707.

Kings

Kingdom of Vientiane (1707–1828)

Kingdom of Vientiane was formed in 1707 as a result of the succession dispute between Sai Ong Hue with his backing from the Vietnamese court at Huế and Kingkitsarat (a grandson of Souligna Vongsa) who was backed by the Tai Lü kingdom of Sipsong Panna.  From 1707 until the annihilation of Vientiane in 1828, the kingdom would at various times be in rivalry with the kingdoms of Luang Prabang and Champasak, although they remained loosely confederated by cultural and historic affinity. By the mid-eighteenth century, the individual Lao kingdoms were simultaneously paying tribute to Burma, China, Siam and Vietnam. Following the Rebellion of Chao Anouvong in 1828, Vientiane was destroyed and both the kingdoms of Vientiane and Champasak falls to the Siamese in 1828. The kingship of Vientiane ends and all territories are annexed to Siam. General Ratchasuphawadi oversees the depopulation of the kingdom and forced relocation to Isaan. The city itself was leveled leaving only Wat Si Saket standing, along with the partial ruins of the Ha Pra Keo, That Dam Stupa, and That Luang Stupa. In 1867, Louis de Carne a part of the Francis Garnier exploratory mission noted that:

“A flourishing capital has been annihilated in our own days, and an entire people has, in some sort, disappeared, without Europe even having suspected such scenes of desolation-without even a solitary echo of this long cry of despair having reached her.”

Kings

Kingdom of Champasak (Bassac) (1713–1904)

The Kingdom of Champasak declared itself independent from the Kingdom of Vientiane in 1713. The Kingdom of Champasak comprised the area south of the Xe Bang River as far as Stung Treng together with the areas of the lower Mun and Xi rivers on the Khorat Plateau (now the Isaan area of modern Thailand). The Kingdom was annexed by Siam in 1829 following the Chao Anouvong Rebellion, and subsequent kings were confirmed in Bangkok. From 1893 French took administrative control over parts of the kingdom, in 1904 the kingdom was reduced to a provincial governorship but still included the political involvement of the Na Champasak royal family. From 1941–45 Thailand exploited France's weakness during World War II to acquire Champasak and other Lao lands on the right bank of the Mekong. In 1946 Champasak was ceded back to France and Chao Boun Oum remitted all claims to an independent kingship in order to unify Laos. The Kingdom of Laos (1946–75) was then formed under the Luang Prabang line of kingship.

Kings

Kingdom of Luang Prabang (1707–1893) & French Protectorate of Laos (1893-1947)

With the division of Lan Xang, the city of Luang Prabang recovered its prestige as a royal city, since the capital had moved to Vientiane with Setthathirath in 1560. The city was a growing center for religion and trade, but remained politically weak and would be sacked by the Burmese in 1764. Throughout the 18th and 19th centuries the Kingdom endured as a vassal to China, Siam, Burma, and Vietnam. In 1828 following Chao Anouvong's Rebellion the kingdom was annexed by Siam. Despite their vassal status the Kings of Luang Prabang exercised a degree of autonomy, but lacked the security apparatus to effectively defend the kingdom (which may have been used in rebellion, as had been done in the kingdoms of Vientiane and Champasak). As a result, throughout the mid-19th century Haw pirates from China were able to invade.

Kings

Principality of Xiang Khouang (Muang Phuan) (1707–1899)

The Muang of Xiang Khouang was a semi-autonomous region in Laos in what is now Xiang Khouang province. The Phuan (Pu’on) monarchy claims descent from Khun Borom and were part of the Lan Xang mandala. Geographic isolation and frequent warfare produced periods where the Phuan kings tried to assert more authority, but the region remained only a key vassalage for surrounding kingdoms. The region features prominently in the 18th and 19th century as valuable coalition piece for the rival kingdoms of Vientiane and Champasak. Xiang Khouang was a trade frontier, and also frequent point of invasion, and so has more cultural influences from China and Vietnam.

Kings

Kingdom of Laos (1947–1975)

The Kingdom of Laos created in 1947 marked the first time the kingdoms of Laos had been unified since the division of Lan Xang in 1707. The Franco-Lao Treaty of 1953, gave Laos independence and the Royal Lao Government took control of the country. This treaty established a constitutional monarchy, with Sisavang Vong as King and Prince Souvanna Phouma as Prime Minister. In 1959, after the death of his father King Sisavang Vong, Sisavang Vatthana ascended the throne and was crowned King. On 2 December 1975, King Sisavang Vatthana was forced to abdicate by the Pathet Lao, after its victory in the Laotian Civil War.

Monarchy of Laos in exile (1975–present)

Pretenders

Princes
 Vong Savang (Crown Prince, died  1978 in re-education camps with his father King Sisavang Vatthana) 
 Sauryavong Savang (Regent, son of Sisavang Vatthana, died  2018 in Paris, France at age 80)
 Soulivong Savang (Pretender, son of Vong Savang) 
 Thanyavong Savang

Kuhn Lo Dynasty

See also
 Three Princes of the Kingdom of Laos
 President of Laos
 Prime Minister of Laos

References

Monarchs
Lan Xang
 
Lan Xang Monarchs
Monarchs
Kingdom of Laos
1975 disestablishments in Laos